Shyamnagar is a town in Bhatpara Municipality of North 24 Parganas district in the Indian state of West Bengal. It is a part of the area covered by Kolkata Metropolitan Development Authority (KMDA). The locality is considered one of the major development hubs in the district. It is sometimes also referred to as Barrackpore-Shyamnagar as it comes after Barrackpore.

Geography

Location
It is spread linearly along the banks of the River Hooghly in a north–south direction. Much of the city was originally a vast wetland, reclaimed over the decades to accommodate the city's burgeoning population. The remaining wetland, known as East Calcutta Wetlands has been designated a "wetland of international importance" under the Ramsar Convention.

96% of the population of Barrackpore subdivision (partly presented in the map alongside) live in urban areas. In 2011, it had a density of population of 10,967 per km2 The subdivision has 16 municipalities and 24 census towns.

For most of the cities/ towns information regarding density of population is available in the Infobox. Population data is not available for neighbourhoods. It is available for the entire municipal area and thereafter ward-wise.

All places marked on the map are linked in the full-screen map.

Physical features
Like the most of the Indo-Gangetic plains, the predominant soil and water type is alluvial. Quaternary sediments consisting of clay, silt, various grades of sand and gravel underlie the city. According to the Bureau of Indian Standards, the town falls under seismic zone-III, in a scale of I to V (in order of increasing proneness to earthquakes) while the wind and cyclone zoning is "very high damage risk", according to UNDP report.

Police station
Jagaddal police station under Barrackpore Police Commissionerate has jurisdiction over Bhatpara Municipal area.

Post Office
While Shyamnagar has a delivery sub post office Mulajore has a non-delivery sub post office, both with PIN 743127 in the North Presidency Division of North 24 Parganas district in Calcutta region. Other post offices with the same PIN are Kowgachhi, Paltapara, Feeder Road, Gurdah, Mondalpara and Purbabidhyadharpur.

Demographics
The jute mills drew in a large labor force from the neighboring states of Bihar and Orissa, as well as eastern Uttar Pradesh, quite often forming an overwhelming majority of the population in the area, living in shanty towns and bustees dotting the mill area. Also, a sizeable portion of the youths are engaged in the foreign and Indian Multinational companies who are opening their offices in the Salt Lake and Rajarhat area of Kolkata.

History
The name of Shyamngar came from a folk etymology of Samne+ garh (সামনে+ গঢ়), which in course of time changed to Shyamnagar.

During the rule of Raja Krishnachandra Roy of Krishnanagar, the king gave the village called 'Mulajore' along with a title of Roy Gunakar to his court poet Bharatchandra Ray. In memory of Bharat Chandra Roy Gunakar there is an old and historic library named Bharat Chandra Library, established in 1906. It is situated close to the railway station.

Relatives of Rabindranath Tagore had set up Mulajor Kalibari at Shyamnagar in North 24 Parganas and it is unknown to many people. The temple beside Hooghly River is very eye soothing. One of the priests said the temple was constructed on 31 Baishakh in 1219 Bengali year around 200 years ago beside Hooghly River even before Dakhineswar Kali temple was set up by Rani Rashmoni Devi. Six priests are engaged for offering puja to goddess Kali and one of the temple priests said. "No dedicated book had been written on this temple and gradually history is fading away but we know relatives of Rabindranath Tagore constructed this temple".

Srijit Thakur is the surviving member of the Thakur family whose ancestors set up the temple, lives in Rajbari at Pathuriaghata Street near Natunbazar in Kolkata. According to the biographer of Rabindranath Tagore, Prabhat Kumar Mukhopadhyaya, the original surname of the Tagores was Kushari. They were Rarhi Brahmins and originally belonged to a village named Kush in the district named Burdwan in West Bengal. Rabindranath Tagore's ancestor Dinanath Kushari, the son of Bhatta Narayana was a native of this village. Generations later different branches of the Kusharis migrated to different parts of Bengal; one of the branches migrated to Jessore District and settled there. One of the descendants Panchanan Kushari later came back from Jessore District in East Bengal to West Bengal and settled in Gobindopur. "Panchanan got the title thakur since then his family member used to write the title Thakur instead of Kusari," said a priest. Jairam Thakur (Kusari) was latter generation had four sons- Anandiram, Nilmoni, Darpanarayan and Gobindaram. Prince Dwarkanath Tagore was the next generation of Anandiram, whose son was Debendranath and Rabindranath was his eighth son. Debendranath, however, became Brahmo and did not believe in idol worshipping. It had not been known whether he or his sons ever visited the temple. Gopimohan Thakur, the son of Darpanarayan founded the temple. Gopimohan had two sons Prsanna Kumar and Harakumar and daughter Brahmamoyee.

Prasanna Kumar had one son Pradyot Kumar and Harakumar had Jatindromohan. Surviving member Srijit Thakur is the son of Prabirendro Mohan, who was the son of Pradyot Kumar. According to local tale that the present place of the Kali temple was occupied of 'Nandi' (caste) and 'Pirali' so experienced priest from 'Bhatpara toll (Sanskrit educational institution)' used to refuse offering puja to the goddess Mulajore Shyamnagar Kali as a result priests were brought from Bankura, Burdwan and other places. Later a Sanskrit College was set up by the king Gopimohan Thakur as a matter of pride and to make erudite Sanskrit students. Students were accommodated in this college hostel they used to take Prasad in the temple as a lunch and dinner. Ramkumar Chattopadhyaya, elder brother of Ramakrishna Dev was the student of this college. But instead of reconstructing that dilapidated building, a heritage building of the locality with its Ionic pillars Rabindra Bhawan was set up by municipality replacing the college, ignoring the sense of heritage.

Overview

Shyamnagar is situated on the east bank of the Ganges. A Kali Temple is situated in between Shyamnagar railway station and Hooghly river is known as Mulajore Kalibari. An auditorium named Rabindra Bhavan was built by Bhatpara Municipality by the side of this Kali Temple. It was said that there was a Sanskrit College in the Nineteenth century and Pandit Vidyasagar used to visit over there. A fair called Poush Mela is organised every year in Poush Mash according to Bengali calendar and between December and January in English calendar. The place becomes holy with the blessings of the goddesses Kali and Ganga. The Shyamnagar Book Fair is organised by Shubhas Shanga Club Battala every year at the time of Poush Mela at Kalibari area. Other than the Mulajore Kalibari there are three other notable Kali Bari (Kali Temples) situated in Shyamnagar. They are Chowrangi Kalibari, Sidhheswari Kalibari and Rakshakali temple. There is also one Buddhist monastery situated by the railway line.

Culture
Shyamnagar is birthplace of Pundit Ajoy Chakraborty, a well known classical musician. It is also the residence of Aneek Dhar, a singer who has won and hosted many reality shows focused around singing. Many well known athletes such as Subrata Bhattacharya, Kesto Pal, Mahabir Prasad, Asoklal Banerjee, and Sumit Mukherjee reside here.

An annual book fair is held in the Kali Bari grounds during the first week of January. Notable Bengali authors, Troilokyanath Mukhopadhay and Rangalal Mukhopadhay were born here. Bharat Chandra Roy Library is a well known library in this area. It was founded in 1906 by Bankim Chandra Chatterjee.

Companies and factories

Exide Industries Limited
 Exide's range and scale of manufacturing operations can be matched by few companies in the world. Together, they produce an annual output of 8 Million Units in Automobile batteries (including batteries for motor-cycle applications), and over 600 Million Ampere-Hours of Industrial Power.
 Apart from the conventional Flooded Flat Plate batteries for Automotive application, Exide also produces industrial range of batteries, which includes, Flooded – Flat plate, Flooded – Tubular plate, Flooded – Plante and Sealed Maintenance Free VRLA batteries. Miners' Cap Lamp Batteries are also produced.
 Exide is the only producer of Submarine batteries in India and one of the few in the world.

Nicco Corporation Limited – Cable Division

Nicco Corporation Limited – Cable Division, an ISO 9001:2008 & 14001:2004 certified unit, is located on East Ghosh Para Road,
Athpur, Shyamnagar, on the banks of river Ganga.

The plant at Shyamnagar produces the following types of cables:-

 Elastomeric cables for host of applications- Mining, Railways, Steel/Power/Petrochem Plants, Shipboard, Heavy Engineering, and Material Handling.
 Large range of specialized cable for Defence (e.g. Water tight cables and buoyant cables).
 Electron Beam Irradiated Cables for a wide range of applications.
 XLPE & PVC power and control cables (including Flame Retardant, Low Smoke, Low Halogen (FRLS & LSZH).
 Zero halogen fire survival category (FS).
 Array of highly specialized Instrumentation, Data Transmission and miniature cables (including Fluoroplastic category).
 Special high temperature conductors (Kapton covered).
 Overhead Grooved conductors for Railway electrification.

Ramsarup Industries Limited

 Ramsarup Industries Limited, an ISO 9001:2000 unit, took over the Steel Division of Nicco Corporation Ltd in August 2002. The above unit is engaged in manufacturing of TMT Bars, Wire Rods and Steel Wires.
 Installed capacity of TMT Bars (Re-inforcement & Debars) – 167000 MTs & Steel Wires – 36000 Mts.
 Only producer in India to provide complete range of 8mm to 40mm Bars using Thermex Technology.
 Supplier to large projects and companies and registered with Contractor of NHPC, NTPC, CPWD, Nuclear Power Corporation etc.

Apart from the above factories, there are other renowned factories:
 Annapurna Cotton Mills
 Gouri Shankar Jute Mills
 Hindustan Lever (Dalda Division) – presently changed the name.

Transport

Trains
Local and passenger trains are available every now and then to go to Kolkata, Budge Budge, Katwa, Bardhaman etc. Not only the Sealdah-Ranaghat and Bardhaman local (via Bandel) but also all of the Sealdah main line trains crosses from the heart of the town as well. The Maitri Express, connecting not just two cities Kolkata to Dhaka but two countries, passes from this town.
all type of service are available here, many school are here 
1.shyamnagar girls
2.mulajor sitanath pathsala
3.shyamnagar kantichandra high school
4.risha arbanda vidda niketon

Aeroplanes
Dum Dum Airport, better known as Netaji Subhash Chandra Bose International Airport is less than 30 km from here and well connected by roadways.

Buses
It is served by two major roadways of the district – Ghoshpara Road and Kalyani Expressway. Both of them are well connected with the capital city of west Bengal, Kolkata. Few bus services available from various locations are: 1. Route no. 85 – a private bus service connecting Kanchrapara on one side to Barrackpore on the other, 2. WBSTC – a government bus service connecting shyamnagar to Garia (South Kolkata), 3. CSTC – another bus service connecting Shyamnagar to Digha (From Habra Bus Depot).

Ferry
Regular ferry services are available on river hooghly from Shyamnagar to Telenipara at Amit Nagar(Bhadreshwar, Chandanagore) at a regular interval of 15 minutes.

Education 
Shyamnagar's schools are either run by the state government or by private organisations. Schools mainly use Bengali or English as the medium of instruction, though Hindi is also used. The schools are affiliated with any of the following — West Bengal Board of Secondary Education, the Indian Certificate of Secondary Education (ICSE), and the National Institute of Open School (NIOS). Under the 10+2+3 plan, after completing their secondary education, students typically enroll in a 2-year junior college (also known as a pre-university) or in schools with a higher secondary facility affiliated with West Bengal Council of Higher Secondary Education, ICSE or CBSE. Students usually choose from one of three streams — liberal arts, commerce, or science, though vocational streams are also available. Upon completing the required coursework, students may enrol in general or professional degree programmes.

List of some Reputed Schools in Shyamnagar : 
St. Augustine's Day School Shyamnagar
 Morning Bells Academy
 Authpur National Model H.S School
 Shyamnagar Kanti Chandra High School
 Mulajore Sitanath Pathsala High School
 Shyamnagar Balika Vidyalaya (HS)
 Authpur High (H/S) School at Authpur 1 kilometre away from Shyamnagar. This school was inaugurated by Ishwar Chandara Vidyasagar. Oldest school in Authpur-Shyamnagar locality.
 Authpur Balika Vidyalaya (HS), Authpur
 Shyamnagar Rishi Aurobindo Vidyaniketan (Boys)
 Shyamnagar Rishi Aurobindo Balika Vidyalaya (Girls)
 Jawaharlal Nehru Smrity Vidya Mandir
 Mandalpara Vidya Niketan
 Mandalpara Girls' High School
 Shree Gouri Shanker Jute Mills High School
 Swami Vivekananda High school;(vocational education/ civil engineering & Agriculture )x+2 Level
 Brahmamayee Vidyamandir
 Shantigarh Nivanani Smriti Vidyapith
 Harakh Chand Kankaria Jain Vidyalaya
 Shyama Chandra H.S School
Gurdah High School

References

External links

Cities and towns in North 24 Parganas district
Neighbourhoods in North 24 Parganas district
Neighbourhoods in Kolkata
Kolkata Metropolitan Area